Kevin P. Ryan is an American investor and entrepreneur who has founded several New York-based businesses, including Gilt Groupe, Business Insider and MongoDB. Ryan helped grow DoubleClick from 1996 to 2005, first as president and later as CEO. Ryan continues to found and invest in companies through AlleyCorp, a venture capital firm he founded with Dwight Merriman in 2008. He holds a B.A. from Yale University and an M.B.A. from INSEAD.

Career 
Ryan began his career working at United Media. Ryan launched the Dilbert web site, based on the popular comic strip created by Scott Adams. Serving as senior VP of business and finance, he helped lead a restructuring effort that increased United Media's profits fivefold. Ryan also spent time with Euro Disney in France, and as an investment banker with Prudential Investment Corporation in the US and the UK.

DoubleClick 
Ryan helped build DoubleClick from 1996 to 2005, first as president and later as CEO.  During this time, DoubleClick grew from a 20-person startup to a publicly traded company with over 1,500 employees. DoubleClick was sold in 2005 for $1.1 billion to Hellman and Friedman LLC, and Ryan stepped down as CEO shortly thereafter. DoubleClick was acquired by Google for $3.1 billion in March 2008.

TheLadders.com and HotJobs 
In 2004, Ryan became an angel investor in  TheLadders.com. He also was an early investor and board member of HotJobs, which was purchased by Yahoo! for $436 million in 2002. During this time in career, Ryan also served on the boards of the Direct Marketing Association, the Ad Council, and HotJobs.

AlleyCorp 
After leaving DoubleClick, Ryan, along with former DoubleClick CTO and co-founder, Dwight Merriman, founded a network of three affiliated Internet companies of which he is chairman and CEO. AlleyCorp has expanded its mission to both found and invest in companies in New York City. Combined, these companies have raised more than $700 million in venture capital funding and have employed over 2,000 people.

Gilt Groupe 
Founded by Ryan and Dwight Merriman in 2007, Gilt Groupe is an online shopping site. Gilt offers fashion for women, men, and children; home decor; artisanal ingredients; hotels and travel experiences on every continent. Gilt Groupe secured over $240 million in total financing. Its investors include Matrix Partners,  General Atlantic Partners, Softbank Group, New Enterprise Associates, Draper Fisher Jurvetson and Goldman Sachs. In February 2014, Gilt Groupe was preparing for an IPO. However, the company sold to the Hudson's Bay Company in January 2016 for $250 million.

Business Insider
Ryan and Dwight Merriman founded Business Insider in 2009 with Henry Blodget. Ryan functioned as chairman of the board through its acquisition by Axel Springer SE for $442 million.

MongoDB 
Ryan and Dwight Merriman founded MongoDB Inc. in 2007. Ryan served as chairman of the board through the company's initial public offering in 2017 at a $1.18 billion valuation.

Other 
Ryan has gone on to found and serve as chairman of the board for several other New York-based companies including, Zola, Coedition, Nomad Health, and Meetup.

Ryan was a founding advisor and seed investor for Pearl Health, before participating in the company's Andreessen Horowitz-led Series A fundraise, alongside AlleyCorp. He currently sits on the board of Pearl Health.

Philanthropy 
Ryan has served on the boards of Mercy Corps, Partnership for New York City, Yale University, Tech:NYC, the Trust for Governors Island, the NYC Investment Fund and INSEAD. He has been named the director emeritus of Human Rights Watch as well as being on the advisory board for Doctors Without Borders. He is also a member of the Yale International Council and the Council on Foreign Relations. He was one of the project chairs for NYC Mayor Michael Bloomberg's review of the future of NYC's fashion industry, Fashion.NYC.2020. On May 30, 2012, Yale announced that Ryan has been elected to serve a six-year term as a member of the Yale corporation, the university's governing body.

Recognitions 
In June 2009, Ryan was named Entrepreneur of the Year by Ernst & Young, LLP and In 2013 was named one of "The 100 Most Influential New Yorkers of the Past 25 Years" by the Observer. Ryan was also named one of the "50 Most Influential Business People" by Crain's New York Business, and was included in Vanity Fair "2011 New Establishment List".

Personal
Ryan earned his B.A. from Yale University in 1985 and his M.B.A. from INSEAD in 1990. He is a Fellow at Yale University's Trumbull College. Ryan currently lives in New York City with his wife and children.

See also
Panther Express
Silicon Alley Insider

References

External links
Profile by scribemedia 
Kevin Ryan on SourceWatch
Ryan profile, "America's Most Productive CEOs", inc.com, March 1, 2010.
"New York Isn’t Silicon Valley. That’s Why They Like It.", New York Times Dealbook, March 7, 2010.
Evans, Teri, "The Ultimate Start-Up Challenge? Hyper Growth", Wall Street Journal, March 11, 2010. Look at Gilt amongst other companies.
"AlleyCorp Churns Out Grab Bag of Tech Companies", New York Times, September 1, 2012.

Living people
American computer businesspeople
American corporate directors
Place of birth missing (living people)
American technology chief executives
American technology company founders
INSEAD alumni
Yale University alumni
1969 births